Richard Deane may refer to:

 Richard Deane (regicide) (1610–1653), English General at Sea, major-general and regicide
 Richard Deane (Lord Mayor) (died 1635), English merchant who was Lord Mayor of London in 1628
 Richard Deane (bishop) (died 1576), Bishop of Ossory
 Richard Deane (priest), Irish Anglican priest

See also 
 Richard Dean (1956–2006), athlete, model and photographer